Jennifer Wright is an American author and journalist. Wright has written six books  and is the political editor-at-large of Harper's Bazaar. She was one of the founders of the now defunct website TheGloss.com.

Early life 
Wright graduated from St. John's College in Annapolis, Maryland.

Career 
Wright is a contributor to a number of publications including The New York Times, The Washington Post, The New York Post, the Observer and Salon.
 She is political editor-at-large at Harper's Bazaar.

She's appeared on television programs such as Watch What Happens Live and Mysteries at the Museum.

Wright has written in support of the current US abortion law. Her book Madame Restell, a biography of the mid-19th century abortionist, made the New York Times note: "In a heartfelt epilogue, Wright observes that Americans don’t take well to learning history. When it is delivered with this kind of blunt force, however, perhaps they might. Whatever readers end up thinking of Madame Restell, they surely cannot miss the core lesson: that there has never been a culture in human history without abortion. The only variable has ever been the cost."

Audible named Get Well Soon the best history book of 2017

Personal life
She is married to Daniel Kibblesmith, a staff writer for The Late Show With Stephen Colbert. They were married on August 26, 2017, in New York City.

Published books 
 It Ended Badly: Thirteen of the Worst Breakups in History (2015)
 Get Well Soon: History's Worst Plagues and the Heroes Who Fought Them (2017)
 Killer Fashion: Poisonous Petticoats, Strangulating Scarves, and Other Deadly Garments Throughout History (2017)
 We Came First: Relationship Advice from Women Who Have Been There (2019)
 She Kills Me: The True Stories of History's Deadliest Women (2021)
 "Madame Restell: The Life, Death, and Resurrection of Old New York's Most Fabulous, Fearless, and Infamous Abortionist '' (2023)

References

External links
 Interview with ''Paste Magazine
 Vice
 Interview with Kirkus Reviews
Interview with Refinery29

Living people
American women historians
21st-century American women writers
American women journalists
St. John's College (Annapolis/Santa Fe) alumni
Women magazine editors
American magazine editors
1986 births